This article lists the largest companies in India in terms of their revenue, net profit and total assets, according to the American business magazines Fortune and Forbes.

2022 Forbes list  

This list is based on the Forbes Global 2000, which ranks the world's 2,000 largest publicly traded companies. The Forbes list takes into account a multitude of factors, including the revenue, net profit, total assets and market value of each company; each factor is given a weighted rank in terms of importance when considering the overall ranking. The table below also lists the headquarters location and industry sector of each company. The figures are in billions of US dollars and are for the year 2022. All 50 companies from India in the Forbes 2000 are listed.

2021 Fortune list 
The 50 largest companies by revenue in 2021 according to the Fortune India 500.

See also 
List of most valuable companies in India
List of companies of India
List of largest employers in India
List of largest companies by revenue
List of public sector undertakings in India

References 

India
Largest
  
companies